The 2015–16 UCLA Bruins women's basketball team represented the University of California, Los Angeles during the 2015–16 NCAA Division I women's basketball season. The Bruins, led by fifth year head coach Cori Close, play their home games at the Pauley Pavilion and are members of the Pac-12 Conference. They finished the season 26–9, 14–4 in Pac-12 play to finish in a tie for third place. They advanced to the championship game of the Pac-12 women's tournament where they lost to Oregon State. They earned an at-large bid to the NCAA women's tournament where they defeated Hawaii in the first round and South Florida in the second round, before losing to Texas in the Sweet Sixteen.

Offseason

Departures

Incoming transfer

2015 recruiting class

Roster

Rankings

Schedule

|-
!colspan=9 style="background:#0073CF; color:gold;"| Exhibition

|-
!colspan=9 style="background:#0073CF; color:gold;"| Non-conference regular season

|-
!colspan=9 style="background:#0073CF; color:gold;"| Pac-12 regular season

|-
!colspan=9 style="background:#0073CF;"| Pac-12 Women's Tournament

|-
!colspan=9 style="background:#0073CF;"| NCAA Women's Tournament

See also
2015–16 UCLA Bruins men's basketball team

Notes
 February 29, 2016 – Jordin Canada, Nirra Fields, and Monique Billings (honorable mention) were named to the All-Pac-12 team
 March 23, 2016 – Coach Cori Close was named the 2016 United States Marine Corps/WBCA NCAA Division I Region 5 Coach of the Year
 March 29, 2916 – Jordin Canada received Honorable Mention on the Associated Press All-America team

References

UCLA
UCLA Bruins women's basketball
UCLA